Mogzon is an urban locality (an urban-type settlement) in the eastern part of Khiloksky District of Zabaykalsky Krai, Russia, located at the confluence of the Khila and Khilok Rivers. Population:

History
Mogzonsky (Khilinsky) Arshan springs have been known to exist in this are since the end of the 19th century.  A Buryat ulus of Mokzon was located in the vicinity. In 1895, a railway station at Arshan was established. It was later moved to the area of modern Mogzon and given its present name. In 1938, it was granted urban-type settlement status.

Economy
Mogzon's population growth and industrial development was and is tied to railway infrastructure. Mogzon is a railway station of the Trans-Siberian Railway.

Culture
There is the museum of Mogzon's history founded in 1988.

See also
Zagarino

References

Notes

Sources
Энциклопедия Забайкалья. Entry on "Mogzon".

External links
Pictures of Mogzon

Urban-type settlements in Zabaykalsky Krai